The Defence Staff is an advisory body of the Ministry of National Defense of Uruguay on issues related to the planning and coordination of activities carried out by the Armed Forces. Created from Law 18,650 of February 19, 2010, its current headquarters was inaugurated in 2011, and is located on Avenida Luis Alberto de Herrera at its intersection with Monte Caseros St.

Functions 
The powers of the Defense Staff are included in Article 16 of Law No. 18,650, and in Article 6 of Law No. 19,775.

 Doctrinal development and planning of joint operations of the Armed Forces.
 Analysis and assessment of strategic scenarios.
 Logistics planning of the Armed Forces at the ministerial level, particularly with regard to weapons systems, communications, equipment and new technologies.
 Advise on the planning of the design of the Forces.
 Advise, at the request of the Minister of National Defense, on the joint training of military personnel, from the Officer Training Schools.
 Receive, analyze and raise the reports of the Defense Attachés of the Republic accredited to foreign governments.

Chief of the Defense Staff 
The position of Chief of the Defense Staff is regulated by article 16 of Law No. 18,650. The holder is designated among the General Officers or active Admirals, and has the same hierarchy as the Commanders-in-Chief of the different branches, therefore, at the time of designation, it is granted the rank of Army General, Admiral or General of the Air, depending on whether it belongs to the Army, Navy or Air Force respectively. Likewise, no type of rotation is established between each branch of the Armed Forces, since the designation is given by confidence of the Executive.

The holder of the position may remain in activity for up to five years counted from the promotion, having as an exception the cessation as Commander-in-Chief due to appointment as Chief of the General Staff. In the event of being dismissed from his position, the chief of the defense staff must go into mandatory retirement.

References

External links 

 Official website

Military of Uruguay
2010 establishments in Uruguay
Staff (military)